Maghar (also al-Maghar or Mghar; lit. the caves) is a city of mixed population of Muslims, Christians, and Druze in Israel's Northern District with an area of 19,810 dunams. Maghar was given the status of a local council in 1956, and of a city in 2021. Its population consists of 57% Druze, 23% Christians, and 20% Muslims.

History

Antiquity
Pottery remains from the early Roman period have been found here, together with architectural remains and pottery fragments from the Late Roman period.  A quarry has also been excavated.

The city's name comes from the Arabic word for "the caves".

Ottoman Empire
The village  was incorporated into the Ottoman Empire in 1517 with all of Palestine, and in  1555 a tax was paid on silk spinning.  In 1596 the village appeared in the  tax registers as Magar Hazur,  located in  the nahiya of Tabariyya, part of Sanjak Safad with an entirely Muslim population consisting of 169 households and 17 bachelors. The villagers paid a fixed  tax rate of 25% on various agricultural products, including wheat, barley, olive trees,  goats and/or beehives, in addition on a press for olives or grapes, a total of 14,136 akçe. 

In 1838, el Mughar was noted as a  Christian and Druze village in the Esh-Shagur district, located between Safad, Acca and Tiberias.

In 1875  Victor Guérin found the village, which he called el-Mehar, to be a large one with 1200 inhabitants. It was divided into three quarters, with Muslim, Christian and Druse inhabitants.  In 1881,  the Palestine Exploration Fund's Survey of Western Palestine described El Mughar as a "large stone-built village, containing about 1,100 Moslems, Druses, and Christians, situated on the slope of the hill, with extensive olive-groves to the south and west; a large spring and birkeh
gives a good supply of water."

A population list from about 1887 showed  El Mughar el Hazzur to have  about 1,360 inhabitants; 180 Muslims, 625 Druze and 420 Catholic Christians.

British Mandate

In the 1922 census of Palestine, conducted  by the British Mandate authorities, Mughar wa  Mansura had a total population of 1377. Of these, 265 were Muslim, 676 Druze and  436 Christians. All the Christians were Roman Catholic. In  the 1931 census the population of Maghar, together with Al-Mansura, was a total of  1733, in 373 inhabited houses. Of  these, 307 were Muslim, 549 Christians, and 877 Druze.

In the 1945 statistics  the population of Maghar, together with Al-Mansura, was 2,140;  90 Muslims, 800 Christians and 1,250 others. who owned 55,583 dunams of land  according to an official land and population survey.  7,864 dunams were plantations and irrigable land, 18,352  for cereals, while 55 dunams were built-up (urban) land.

Israel 

During Operation Hiram, 29–31 October 1948, the town surrendered to the advancing Israeli army. Many of the inhabitants fled north but some stayed and were not expelled by the Israeli soldiers. The town remained under Martial Law until 1966.

In 2005 Druze attacked Christians after rumors spread that some Christian youths created photo images of Druze girls as nude models and posted them on the internet. Christian shops, vehicle, house and the church were vandalized. The clashes forced around 2,000 of the Christians to flee their homes. according to Jack Khoury this clash may be a result of animosity between the wealthier Christian population and the poorer Druze. According to the police investigation, it turns out that a Druze youth had spread lie to his friends about the pictures. Dan Ronen the commander of Northern District commander called the violence "a pogrom".

During the 2006 Israel-Lebanon conflict, two residents of Maghar were killed and several wounded in Hezbollah rocket and cluster bomb attacks. On July 25,  Doua Abbas, 15, was killed by a rocket that hit her house. On August 4, Manal Azzam, a 27-year-old mother of two, was killed, and two other residents were seriously wounded when a rocket hit their apartment building.

Following a Facebook post supporting the 2017 Temple Mount shooting by a Muslim resident of Maghar, the hometown of one of the Druze victims, two mosques in the village were attacked in two separate incidents on the nights of 14 and 16 July with stun grenades and gunfire resulting in minor property damage. Israeli Police were on the scene of the attacks within minutes, where they gathered evidence and opened an investigation.

Demographics 

The majority of residents are Druze (57.9%), with Arab Christians (21%) and Muslim (21.1%) minorities. Many of the Druze residents serve in the IDF and Israel Police. The Christian population is mostly Melkite Catholic.

Education and culture
In August 2003, the Israel Circus School established a joint Jewish-Arab "Children’s Circus" together with its partner, Circus Maghar. A group of 20 Jewish and Arab children trained for the circus. In addition to local performances, the circus school toured Cyprus, giving workshops and performances for Christian and Muslim schools and community centers.

Notable people

 Mansour Abbas, politician
 Naim Araidi, a Druze resident of Maghar, a professor of Hebrew literature at Haifa University and Bar Ilan University, was appointed Israel's ambassador to Norway in 2012
 Suliman Bashear, was a leading Druze Arab scholar and professor, who taught at Birzeit University, An-Najah National University, and the Hebrew University of Jerusalem. Bashear was noted for his work on the early historiography of Islam
 Ihab Khatib, soldier
 Salman Masalha, poet, writer, essayist and translator
 Daud Turki,  a Palestinian-Arab poet and the leader of the Jewish-Arab socialist group called the Red Front

See also
Arab localities in Israel
Druze in Israel

References

Bibliography

External links
 Facebook page of Maghar
 City council website 
 Welcome To Maghar
 Survey of Western Palestine, Map 6:  IAA, Wikimedia commons 

Arab localities in Israel
Arab Christian communities in Israel
Druze communities in Israel
Local councils in Northern District (Israel)